This is the list of notable stars in the constellation Puppis, sorted by decreasing brightness.

This constellation's Bayer designations (Greek-letter star names) were given while it was still considered part of the constellation of Argo Navis. After Argo Navis was broken up into Carina, Vela, and Puppis, these Greek-letter designations were kept, so that Puppis does not have a full complement of Greek-letter designations. For example, since Argo Navis's alpha star went to Carina, there is no Alpha Puppis.

See also
List of stars by constellation

References

List
Puppis